The 2016 Vuelta a Castilla y León was the 31st edition of the Vuelta a Castilla y León cycle race and was held on 15 April to 17 April 2016. The race started in Alcañices and finished at the Alto de la Plataforma. The race was won by Alejandro Valverde.

General classification

References

Vuelta a Castilla y León
Vuelta a Castilla y León by year
2016 in Spanish sport